Joarilla de las Matas is a municipality in the province of León, Castile and León, Spain. According to the 2010 census (INE), the municipality had a population of 366 inhabitants.

References

Municipalities in the Province of León